Willian Thiego de Jesus (22 July 1986 – 28 November 2016), known as Willian Thiego or simply Thiego, was a Brazilian footballer who played as a centre back. He was one of the victims when LaMia Airlines Flight 2933 crashed on 28 November 2016.

Club career

Grêmio
Born in Aracaju, Sergipe, Thiego started his career at Sergipe's youth setup, and impressed enough to secure a move to Grêmio in 2006.

Initially assigned to the under-20s, Thiego was promoted to the first team the following year; known as Willian Thiego, he only used the last name due to the presence of Willian Magrão in the squad. He made his Série A debut during the campaign, contributing with 11 appearances.

On 14 June 2008 Thiego scored his top tier goal, a powerful close-range shot in a 3–0 away win against Goiás. He would subsequently appear regularly for the club, also representing the side in 2009 Copa Libertadores.

Thiego was sent on a one-year loan to Kyoto Sanga FC in January 2010. Upon returning, he subsequently served another temporary deal at Bahia before leaving the club.

Ceará / Figueirense
On 5 March 2012, Thiego was sold to Ceará. He immediately became a regular starter at the club, but was still released on 31 October.

On 16 January 2013, Thiego signed a one-year deal with Figueirense.

Khazar Lankaran
Following the expiration of his Figueirense contract, Thiego signed an 18-month contract with Khazar Lankaran of the Azerbaijan Premier League on 27 January 2014. He left Khazar Lankaran in December 2014, after having his contract cancelled by the club.

Chapecoense
In January 2015, Willian Thiego signed for Chapecoense. A backup to Rafael Lima during his first season, he became a regular starter during his second.

On 15 June 2016, Thiego scored a brace in a 3–3 home draw against former club Grêmio.

Death

On 28 November 2016, whilst at the service of Chapecoense, Thiego was among the fatalities of the LaMia Airlines Flight 2933 accident in the Colombian village of Cerro Gordo, La Unión, Antioquia.

Career statistics

Honours
Grêmio
Campeonato Gaúcho: 2007

Chapecoense
Copa Sudamericana: 2016 (posthumously)

References

External links 
 

1986 births
2016 deaths
Association football defenders
Brazilian footballers
Brazilian expatriate footballers
Campeonato Brasileiro Série A players
Campeonato Brasileiro Série B players
Club Sportivo Sergipe players
Grêmio Foot-Ball Porto Alegrense players
Esporte Clube Bahia players
Ceará Sporting Club players
Figueirense FC players
Associação Chapecoense de Futebol players
Khazar Lankaran FK players
J1 League players
Kyoto Sanga FC players
Brazilian expatriate sportspeople in Japan
Expatriate footballers in Japan
Expatriate footballers in Azerbaijan
Footballers killed in the LaMia Flight 2933 crash
People from Aracaju
Sportspeople from Sergipe